Zanthoxylum spinosum is a species of flowering plant in the family Rutaceae known by the common name Biscayne prickly-ash. It is native to the West Caribbean, including South Florida and the Florida Keys, Cuba, Bahamas, Cayman Islands, and Hispaniola.

This species is a shrub or tree growing up to 7 meters tall. It is covered in prickles. The leaves are up to 18 centimeters long and are divided into several leaflets. Flowers are borne in cymes. Each has three sepals and three petals. The round, glandular fruits are borne in clusters.

This plant grows on coastal hammocks, beaches, maritime woodlands and scrub. The rocky substrate contains limestone. Associated species include Metopium toxiferum, Coccoloba uvifera, Ardisia escallonioides,  Guapira discolor, and Psychotria nervosa.

This species may be a host to Toxoptera citricida, the brown citrus aphid.

References

External links
USDA Plants Profile

spinosum
Taxa named by Olof Swartz